Alfredo Cornejo (born 20 March 1962) is an Argentine politician. As president of its national committee, he leads the Radical Civic Union (UCR). He was Governor of Mendoza Province from 2015 to 2019. From 2019 to 2021 he was a National Deputy, and since 2021, he has been a National Senator for Mendoza.

Biography
Alfredo Cornejo studied political sciences at the National University of Cuyo. He also worked as a professor at the university.

Political career

During his student years at the National University of Cuyo he was a student leader of the Franja Morada group.

He affiliated to the Radical Civic Union in 1983, and was elected as provincial senator for the 2002–2003 period. He was elected national deputy in 2005, and resigned in 2007 to run for mayor of Godoy Cruz. He served as mayor of Godoy Cruz for two terms, 2007–2011 and 2011–2015.

Governor of Mendoza
In 2015 he was elected governor of the Mendoza Province and being one of the referents of Cambiemos in the interior of the country.

In 2017, he was awarded Michel Temer with the Order of Rio Branco in recognition of the promotion of bilateral ties between the two regions.

In 2018 Sebastián Piñera he was awarded the Order of Bernardo O'Higgins in the degree of Grand Officer in recognition of the collaboration in the integration of Argentina and Chile.

In the same year, the Konex Foundation awarded him a Konex Award - Diploma of Merit as one of the most important Public Administrators of the last decade in Argentina.

References

Governors of Mendoza Province
Mayors of places in Argentina
Members of the Argentine Senate for Mendoza
Members of the Argentine Chamber of Deputies elected in Mendoza
Living people
People from Mendoza Province
1962 births